Marek Sząszor (born 28 August 1970) is a Polish former competitive figure skater. He is a two-time Polish national champion (1990, 1993). After retiring from competition, he became a skating coach in Gdańsk.

Competitive highlights

References 

1970 births
Polish male single skaters
Living people
Sportspeople from Gdańsk